Drover or Drovers may refer to:

Animal moving

 Drover, a person who moves animals over long distances in droving
 Drover (Australian), a person who moves animals over long distances in Australia
 Drover (dog), a dog used for droving

People
 Sam Drover (1911–2005), Canadian politician
 Shawn Drover (born 1966), Canadian heavy metal drummer
 Glen Drover (born 1969), Canadian heavy metal guitarist

Vehicles
 de Havilland Australia DHA-3 Drover, a small transport aircraft
 Holden Drover, a sport utility vehicle

Other
 Drovers (fictional farm), a fictional farm in the television drama McLeod's Daughters
 Drovers Magazine, a monthly magazine
 The Drovers, a Chicago rock band
Drover, a character from the Hank the Cowdog books
 Drover (company), a London-based company
 USAO Drovers, University of Science and Arts of Oklahoma team nickname

See also
 Drovers' road
 Stock route
 Drovers Cave National Park
 Drovers Inn